Gold(II) sulfate is the chemical compound with the formula  or more correctly . This compound was previously thought to be a mixed-valent compound as AuIAuIII(SO4)2. But later, it was shown that it contained the diatomic cation,  which made it the first simple inorganic gold(II) compound. The bond distance between the gold atoms in the diatomic cation is 249 pm.

Production and properties
Gold(II) sulfate is produced by reaction of sulfuric acid and gold(III) hydroxide. Gold(II) sulfate is unstable in air and oxidizes to  hydrogen disulfoaurate(III)().

References

Gold compounds
Sulfates